KOBI (channel 5) is a television station in Medford, Oregon, United States, affiliated with NBC.

KOBI also operates a satellite station in Klamath Falls, KOTI (channel 2). Together, the two stations serve 12 mostly rural counties in southern Oregon and northern California.

History
The station was founded on August 1, 1953, by Bill Smullin, a 20-year veteran of the television industry. Its call letters were originally KBES-TV ("Best TV"), and it carried programming from all four major networks. However, for its first 25 years, it was primarily a CBS affiliate.

Smullin soon realized that KBES' signal was not strong enough to cover all of southern Oregon, which the FCC had ruled was part of the Medford market, so he bought the license for channel 2 in Klamath Falls, and KOTI debuted on August 12, 1956.

In 1962, Smullin changed the call letters to KTVM. When channel 10 was allocated to Medford, Smullin helped the owners of KMED get the license, as well as space on his transmitter on Blackwell Hill. Partly because of his help, KMED-TV (channel 10, now KTVL) signed on in 1961. In 1968, KTVM moved to a powerful transmitter on King Mountain and changed its calls to the current KOBI.

By 1978, KOBI had become a primary ABC affiliate, which by then had become the top network. However, they continued to carry some CBS programs (such as the CBS Evening News and several daytime shows). In 1983, KOBI picked up NBC from KTVL, which switched to CBS. It carried a few ABC programs for another year until KDRV (channel 12) signed on.

For many years, KOBI branded itself as "Channel 5M," for its channel bullet designation within the Oregon State/Southern Oregon State edition of TV Guide, with a logo showing a "5" on an interstate highway sign, reflecting the interstate that goes through the Medford area, Interstate 5. The interstate sign motif was later extended to KOTI and KRCR. KOBI rebranded itself as "The News Channel" in 1998 and as "NBC 5" in 2004, but the highway sign remains today.

The station has a UHF translator, K32DY-D, to serve non-antenna-rotator-equipped households between Medford and Ashland. It is located on Mt. Baldy, east of Phoenix.

Bill Smullin retired in 1985 and was succeeded by his daughter, Patricia C. "Patsy" Smullin, who serves as owner and president today.

KOBI added a DT2 channel for AccuWeather's local and national weather digital channel to KOBI's digital signal were instituted in early 2008. It was replaced by This TV in January 2014, then Cozi TV in December 2019.

Programming

Jackpot Bingo
During the 1980s, KOBI broadcast a popular interactive game show called Jackpot Bingo, hosted by Tom Carnes. The show aired before Days of Our Lives and took after the popular Dialing for Dollars format. Jackpot Bingo gave contestants the opportunity to win up to $5,000 in cash by playing blackout bingo. However, contestants usually won the minimum $200 prize. Carnes was replaced by Sally Holliday in 1987 and the show was renamed $10,000 Jackpot Bingo as the prize money doubled.  Still, contestants usually won $200. The show garnered the highest ratings for its time slot, although it was cancelled in 1988.

Academic Challenge

The Academic Challenge quiz bowl program, similar to GE College Bowl, places local high schools in a head-to-head battle for the championship title and over $40,000 in scholarship money.

Twenty high schools from Southern Oregon and Northern California participate in the Academic Challenge. Each school brings in a team of five students, four participating and one alternate, who answer a series of questions from the host, NBC 5 chief meteorologist Jeff Heaton, on topics such as history, math, literature, current events and a variety of other categories.

At the end of this double-elimination competition the final two teams will split the scholarship money, 60% to the championship team, 40% to the runner-up team.

The idea for Academic Challenge started at KRCR-TV in Redding in 1998 and was hosted by Gary Gunter from 1998 to 2005, then Tim Mapes from then on. NBC 5's newly hired general manager Bob Wise brought the identically formatted program to southern Oregon in 2005.

The program regularly aired on Sundays at 6:30 p.m., or after NBC Sunday Night Football and NBC 5 News during the NFL season, but has since been canceled.

Southern Oregon Meth Project
In 2005, KOBI started a special program called the Southern Oregon Meth Project to educate viewers and concerned citizens about the dangers of methamphetamine and what can be done to prevent it. The project was headed up by KOBI's lead news anchor Christina Anderson, where she remained until her departure for KOVR in Sacramento in 2010.

News operation
KOBI presently broadcasts 22 hours of locally produced newscasts each week (with four hours each weekday and one hour each on Saturdays and Sundays).

Technical information

Subchannels
The station's digital signal is multiplexed:

Analog-to-digital conversion
KOBI shut down its analog signal, over VHF channel 5, on February 17, 2009, the original target date on which full-power television stations in the United States were to transition from analog to digital broadcasts under federal mandate (which was later pushed back to June 12, 2009). The station's digital signal relocated from its pre-transition UHF channel 15 to VHF channel 5 for post-transition operations.

Translators

See also
 KOTI

References

External links

ThisTV Southern Oregon website
Western States Museum of Broadcasting: History of Television In Southern Oregon
Bill Smullin: Southern Oregon TV's pioneer

Television channels and stations established in 1953
OBI (TV)
Cozi TV affiliates
Quest (American TV network) affiliates
Twist (TV network) affiliates
1953 establishments in Oregon
NBC network affiliates